kitty is a free and open-source GPU-accelerated terminal emulator for Linux and macOS focused on performance and features. kitty is written in a mix of C and Python programming languages. It provides GPU support. kitty shares its name with another program — KiTTY — a fork of PuTTY for Microsoft Windows.

Features 

 Display images: when ImageMagick installed, add to .bashrc alias icat="kitty +kitten icat" and use as "icat me.webp"
 Interactive Unicode characters input, by name, code, recently used
 Supports true color, text formatting features
 Tiling of multiple windows and tabs
 Single config file
 Hyperlink clicks
 Mouse support (for example in Vim)
 Multiple copy/paste buffers like in Vim

References 

Free terminal emulators
X Window programs
Free software programmed in Python
Free software programmed in C